Angelina County Airport  is a county-owned, public-use airport in Angelina County, Texas, United States. The airport is located seven nautical miles (13 km) southwest of the central business district of Lufkin, Texas.

Facilities and aircraft 
It has two asphalt paved runways: 7/25 is 5,398 by 100 feet (1,645 x 30 m) and 15/33 is 4,309 by 100 feet (1,313 x 30 m).

For the 12-month period ending July 11, 2008, the airport had 18,500 aircraft operations, an average of 50 per day: 97% general aviation and 3% military. At that time there were 72 aircraft based at this airport: 75% single-engine, 17% multi-engine, 6% jet, 1% helicopter and 1% ultralight.

Historical airline service 

Trans-Texas Airways (TTa) and its successor Texas International Airlines served Lufkin with scheduled passenger air service for over 27 years.  In the fall of 1949, Houston-based TTa was operating 21-seat Douglas DC-3 aircraft (which the airline called the "Starliner") into the airport six times a day with all flights operating a daily round trip routing of Houston Hobby Airport - Galveston - Beaumont/Port Arthur - Lufkin - Palestine, TX - Dallas Love Field.  By the summer of 1968, TTa was still serving Lufkin with the DC-3 in addition to operating other flights with 40-seat Convair 600 turboprop aircraft.  The airline was operating four flights a day into the airport at this time with two nonstops to Houston Hobby Airport and two direct flights to Dallas Love Field via stops in Longview, TX and Tyler, TX.  TTa then changed its name to Texas International Airlines which in the summer of 1970 was operating 15-seat Beechcraft 99 turboprops into Lufkin with nonstop service to Houston Intercontinental Airport (IAH) and direct flights to Dallas Love Field (DAL) via Longview and Tyler.  By the spring of 1974, Texas International had replaced the smaller Beechcraft aircraft and was operating two flights a day from the airport with larger Convair 600 turboprops with direct service to Dallas/Fort Worth International Airport (DFW) via stops in Longview and Tyler.  Texas International then ceased serving Lufkin during the mid 1970s and the air carrier was eventually merged into Continental Airlines.

Several commuter airlines served Lufkin in the past as well.  In early 1976, Metroflight Airlines, a division of Clear Lake City, TX-based Metro Airlines, was serving Lufkin with six flights a day operated with de Havilland Canada DHC-6 Twin Otter twin turboprop aircraft.  Three nonstop flights a day were operated to both Houston Intercontinental Airport (IAH) and nearby Nacogdoches, TX (OCH) with two of these flights to Nacogdoches continuing on to Dallas/Fort Worth International Airport (DFW) via stops in Longview (GGG) and Tyler (TYR).  In the spring of 1981, Abilene, TX-based Chaparral Airlines was operating three nonstop flights a day to Dallas/Ft. Worth (DFW) with Beechcraft 99 propjets.  By 1994, the closest scheduled airline service was being flown from Nacogdoches (OCH) by Lone Star Airlines with nonstop service to Dallas/Fort Worth (DFW) and also nonstop to Natchez, MS (HEZ) with these flights being operated with Fairchild Swearingen Metroliner commuter propjets.

The airport currently does not have any scheduled passenger airline service.

References

External links 
 Angelina County Airport page at Angelina County website
  page from Texas DOT Airport Directory
 Aerial photo as of 8 March 1989/1995 from USGS The National Map
 

Airports in Texas
Texas
Airports
Buildings and structures in Angelina County, Texas
Transportation in Angelina County, Texas